Sir Bedivere may refer to:

 Bedivere, a Knight of the Round Table, who returns Excalibur to the Lady of the Lake
 RFA Sir Bedivere (L3004), a Landing Ship Logistic of the Round Table class